Teen (stylized as TEEN) was an American alternative rock band from Brooklyn, New York, formed in 2010.

The group consisted of Kristina "Teeny" Lieberson, former keyboardist for the Brooklyn band Here We Go Magic, her two sisters Katherine and Lizzie, and Boshra AlSaadi. The Lieberson sisters, daughters of composer Peter Lieberson, hail originally from Halifax, Nova Scotia.

Career
In May 2013, Teen released their EP, Carolina, on Carpark Records.

In 2015, Teen toured with Will Butler of Arcade Fire. The following year, the band toured with of Montreal.

Teen disbanded after two final shows in Chicago and New York in October 2019.

Band members
 Katherine Lieberson
 Kristina Lieberson
 Lizzie Lieberson
 Maia Ibar
 Jane Herships
 Boshra AlSaadi

Discography

Albums 
 2012: In Limbo (Carpark Records)
 2014: The Way and Color (Carpark Records)
 2016: Love Yes (Carpark Records)
 2019: Good Fruit (Carpark Records)

EPs and singles 
 2011: Little Doods
 2013: Carolina (Carpark Records)

References

External links

 
 Teen at Carpark Records

2010 establishments in New York City
2019 disestablishments in the United States
All-female bands
Alternative rock groups from New York (state)
Carpark Records artists
Musical groups disestablished in 2019
Musical groups established in 2010
Musical groups from Brooklyn